Maiyar Ma Mandu Nathi Lagtu is a 2001 Indian Gujarati rom-com family drama film directed by Jashwant Gangani, starring Hiten Kumar and Anandi Tripathi in lead role. The film won 11 of the Gujarat State Film Awards of the year.

Plot

Ram's brother and Ratan's sister are engaged. During their marriage, Ram and Ratan falls into love with each other. Both the family come closer with the hospitality of joint family and the game of Antakshari and due to, Ram and Ratan also come closer. Subsequently, Ram and Ratan's wedding is decided. when Ram falls down during the marriage ritual in wedding-chapel, his father, because of Ram's playful nature, comments: "don't play here" and ignores the incident. When Ram's mother goes close to him, she understands the situation after seeing blood in his mouth. A doctor's report indicates that he has cancer. Thus, the wedding remains unfinished and both the lovers are lost in separation. Ratan out of true love marries Ram but everyone is sad on this happy occasion. Due to Ratan's faith in God and unbounded love, Ram has a successful operation and the story ends happily.

Cast 
 Hiten Kumar
 Anandi Tripathi
 Arvind Trivedi
 Feroj Irani
 Dinesh Lamba
 Chandni Chopara
 Heena Rajput

Production 
Executive producer : Raj Gangani,
Associate Director : Late.Jitu Rathod,
Assistant Dir.Ashvin Borad, 
Production Manager :Hemraj Baraiya, Ganesh Vaghani,

Reception
The film turned out to be a golden jubilee hit and won eleven State Film Awards, including Best Film, Best Director, Best Actor, Best Actress, Best Story, Best Music Director, Best Lyrics, Best Editor and Best Comedian (male).

The film was followed up by its sequel, Maiyar Ma Mandu Nathi Lagtu Part-II, which released in 2008.

References

2001 films
2000s Gujarati-language films
Indian romantic comedy-drama films
Films set in Gujarat